The Man Who Forgot is a 1919 British silent drama film directed by Floyd Martin Thornton and starring James Knight, Marjorie Villis and Bernard Dudley. It was based on a play by the Reverend H.J. Waldron.

Plot summary
After returning from the sea having lost and regained his memory, a sailor finds his fiancée is now married to another man.

Cast
 James Knight as Seth Nalden
 Marjorie Villis as Mona Jennifer
 Bernard Dudley as Jim Hallibar
 Evelyn Boucher as Violet Selwyn
 Harry Agar Lyons as Tarpaulin Jack
 Mowbray Macks as  Salty Felon

References

Bibliography
 Low, Rachael. History of the British Film, 1918-1929. George Allen & Unwin, 1971.

External links

1919 films
1919 drama films
British drama films
British silent feature films
1910s English-language films
Films directed by Floyd Martin Thornton
British films based on plays
Seafaring films
Films set in England
British black-and-white films
1910s British films
Silent drama films
Silent adventure films